Neonitocris sibutensis is a species of beetle in the family Cerambycidae. It was described by Stephan von Breuning in 1956.

Subspecies
 Neonitocris sibutensis sibutensis Breuning, 1956
 Neonitocris sibutensis mabokensis Breuning, 1970

References

sibutensis
Beetles described in 1956